Atuhaire Ogola Ambala (born 26 April 2001) is a Ugandan swimmer. He represented Uganda at the 2019 World Aquatics Championships in Gwangju, South Korea. He competed in the men's 50 metre freestyle and men's 100 metre freestyle events. He also competed in the 4 × 100 metre mixed freestyle relay event.

In 2018, he competed in several events at the African Swimming Championships held in Algiers, Algeria. In 2019, he competed in the men's 100 metre butterfly event at the African Games held in Rabat, Morocco.

He represented Uganda at the 2020 Summer Olympics in Tokyo, Japan. He competed in the men's 100 metre freestyle event.

References

External links

Living people
2001 births
Place of birth missing (living people)
Ugandan male swimmers
Male butterfly swimmers
Ugandan male freestyle swimmers
Swimmers at the 2019 African Games
African Games competitors for Uganda
Swimmers at the 2020 Summer Olympics
Olympic swimmers of Uganda
Swimmers at the 2022 Commonwealth Games
Commonwealth Games competitors for Uganda
21st-century Ugandan people